Altobelli is an Italian surname. Notable people with the surname include:

 Alessandro Altobelli (born 1955), Italian footballer
 Argentina Altobelli (1866-1942), Italian trade unionist
 Daniele Altobelli (born 1993), Italian football player 
 Joe Altobelli (1932–2021), American baseball player, manager and coach
 John Altobelli (1963–2020), American baseball coach
 Julian Altobelli (born 2002), Canadian soccer player
 Leonel Altobelli (born 1986), Argentine footballer 
 Mattia Altobelli (disambiguation), multiple people
 Nicholas Altobelli (born 1985), American singer and songwriter

Italian-language surnames